Amalgamated Productions was a film company established by Richard Gordon in association with Charles F. "Chuck" Vetter Jnr in the 1950s. They made a series of films in England. The first seven were crime films mostly using American stars and stories transplanted to England.

Selected filmography
Assignment Redhead (1956)
The Crooked Sky (1957)
Kill Me Tomorrow (1957)
West of Suez (1957)
The Counterfeit Plan (1957)
Man in the Shadow a.k.a. Violent Stranger (1957)
Escapement (1958)
The Haunted Strangler (1958)
Corridors of Blood (1958)
Fiend Without a Face (1958)
First Man into Space (1959)

References

Film production companies of the United Kingdom